The Croatian Party of Pensioners ( or HSU) is a Croatian centre-left political party that is currently led by Veselko Gabričević.

When the party was founded, few people took it seriously and many commentators speculated that the ultimate purpose of HSU was to take away pensioners' votes from rejuvenated SDP and thus help ruling HDZ remain in power. However, the party gradually built its organisation throughout the country and slowly rose in popularity due to both HDZ and left-centre cabinets of Ivica Račan refusing to honour a Constitutional Court verdict that ordered the government to pay back pensions that had been denied in the early 1990s.

HSU gained much notoriety after local and regional elections in May 2005 when many of its members got elected on left-centre election tickets only to support HDZ and right-wing parties during the forming of coalition governments.

At the 2007 Croatian parliamentary election, the party won 101,091 votes and 4.1% of the votes, but this time the electoral math (D'Hondt method) allowed them to receive only a single representative in the Parliament, Silvano Hrelja. They continued to support the government of Ivo Sanader, which in turn continued to pursue pensioner-related policies aligned with the opinion of the HSU.

In 2009, the economic crisis caused the government of Jadranka Kosor to start talks about extra crisis taxation and after a row with the finance minister Ivan Šuker, the HSU withdrew their support for the government.

The party participated in the Kukuriku coalition since 2011. It continued with the coalition Croatia is Growing at the 2015 Croatian parliamentary election. In that election, it became possible for the candidates of HSU to receive preferential votes, and they won a total of 11,026 (out of a coalition total of 744,507).

Electoral history

Legislative

European Parliament

References

External links

1996 establishments in Croatia
Pensioners' parties
Political parties established in 1996
Political parties in Croatia